Prunus virginiana, commonly called bitter-berry, chokecherry, Virginia bird cherry, and western chokecherry (also black chokecherry for P. virginiana var. demissa), is a species of bird cherry (Prunus subgenus Padus) native to North America.

Description 
The stems rarely exceed  in length.

They get darker and marginally sweeter as they ripen. They each contain a large stone.

Chemistry 
Chokecherries are very high in antioxidant pigment compounds, such as anthocyanins. They share this property with chokeberries, further contributing to confusion.

Similar species 
The chokecherry leaf has a finely serrated margin and is dark green above with a paler underside, while the black cherry leaf has numerous blunt edges along its margin and is dark green and smooth.

Taxonomy 
The name chokecherry is also used for the related Manchurian cherry or Amur chokecherry (Prunus maackii).

Varieties 
 Prunus virginiana var. virginiana (eastern chokecherry)
 Prunus virginiana var. demissa (Nutt. ex Torr. & A.Gray) Torr. (western chokecherry)
 Prunus virginiana var. melanocarpa (A.Nelson) Sarg.

Distribution 
The natural historic range of P. virginiana includes most of Canada (including Northwest Territories, but excluding Yukon, Nunavut, and Labrador), most of the United States (including Alaska, but excluding some states in the Southeast), and northern Mexico (Sonora, Chihuahua, Baja California, Durango, Zacatecas, Coahuila, and Nuevo León).

Ecology 
The wild chokecherry is often considered a pest, as it is a host for the tent caterpillar, a threat to other fruit plants. It is also a larval host to the black-waved flannel moth, the blinded sphinx, the cecropia moth, the coral hairstreak, the cynthia moth, the elm sphinx, Glover's silkmoth, the hummingbird clearwing moth, the imperial moth, the Io moth, the polyphemus moth, the promethea moth, the red-spotted purple, the small-eyed sphinx, the spring azure, the striped hairstreak, the tiger swallowtail, the twin-spotted sphinx, and  Weidemeyer's admiral.

Many wildlife, including birds and game animals, eat the berries. Moose, elk, mountain sheep, deer and rabbits eat the foliage, twigs, leaves, and buds. Deer and elk sometimes browse the twigs profusely, not letting the plant grow above knee height. The leaves serve as food for caterpillars of various Lepidoptera.

Cultivation 
The chokecherry has a number of cultivars. 'Canada Red' and 'Schubert' have leaves that mature to purple and turn orange and red in the autumn. 'Goertz' has a nonastringent, so palatable, fruit. Research at the University of Saskatchewan seeks to find or create new cultivars to increase production and processing.

Toxicity 
The stone of the fruit is poisonous. Chokecherry is toxic to horses, moose, cattle, goats, deer, and other animals with segmented stomachs (rumens), especially after the leaves have wilted (such as after a frost or after branches have been broken), because wilting releases cyanide and makes the plant sweet. Symptoms of a horse that has been poisoned include heavy breathing, agitation, and weakness.

Uses 
For many Native American tribes of the Northern Rockies, Northern Plains, and boreal forest region of Canada and the United States, chokecherries are the most important fruit in their traditional diets and are part of pemmican, a staple traditional food. The bark of chokecherry root is made into an asperous-textured concoction used to ward off or treat colds, fever and stomach maladies by Native Americans. The inner bark of the chokecherry, as well as red osier dogwood, or alder, is also used by some tribes in ceremonial smoking mixtures, known as kinnikinnick. The chokecherry fruit can be eaten when fully ripe, but otherwise contains a toxin. The fruit can be used to make jam or syrup, but the bitter nature of the fruit requires sugar to sweeten the preserves. The Plains Indians pound up the whole fruits—including the toxic pits—in a mortar, from which they made sun-baked cakes.

Chokecherry is also used to craft wine in the Western United States, mainly in the Dakotas and Utah, as well as in Manitoba, Canada.

Culture 
In 2007, North Dakota governor John Hoeven signed a bill naming the chokecherry the state's official fruit, in part because its remains have been found at more archeological sites in the Dakotas than anywhere else.

See also 
 Choke pear

References

External links 

 
 North Dakota State University Agriculture, Chokecherry
 Nutrition Facts for Chokecherries
 Flora of Pennsylvania

Bird cherries
virginiana
Flora of North America
Edible nuts and seeds
Garden plants of North America
Plants used in Native American cuisine
Plants used in traditional Native American medicine
Plants described in 1753
Taxa named by Carl Linnaeus